Maddison Pearman (born 23 January 1996) is a Canadian long track speed skater.

Career
Pearman first represented Canada on the international stage in 2013 at the World Junior Championships.

Pearman's first senior competition came in 2020, when she won a silver in the women's team pursuit at the 2020 Four Continents Speed Skating Championships in Milwaukee, Wisconsin. Pearman also won the gold medal in the team sprint event.

Pearman was named to the 2022 Olympic team, where she competed in the 1000 m and 1500 m events.

Personal records

References

1996 births
Living people
Canadian female speed skaters
People from Ponoka, Alberta
Sportspeople from Alberta
Speed skaters at the 2022 Winter Olympics
Olympic speed skaters of Canada
21st-century Canadian women